Adalbert "Bert" Friedrich (10 June 1884 – 4 July 1962) was a German footballer who played as a forward. He spent his entire career with VfB Leipzig, winning the inaugural German football championship with the club in 1903 and won two further titles in 1906 and 1913. He also represented the German national team in a friendly against Belgium in 1910.

Honours
 German football championship: 1903, 1906, 1913

References

External links
 

1884 births
1962 deaths
Footballers from Leipzig
German footballers
Germany international footballers
Association football forwards